United! is a British television series which was produced by the BBC between 1965 and 1967, and was broadcast twice-weekly on BBC1.

The series followed the fortunes of a fictional second division football team, Brentwich United. The football scenes were filmed on the grounds of Stoke City with Jimmy Hill acting as a technical advisor, and the efforts to achieve authenticity saw the show being criticised by the then management of Wolverhampton Wanderers, who complained that the series was based on their team.

United! was not a success, and was cancelled after two series. The programme was generally considered to be too soft to appeal to male viewers, and too male-oriented for the female soap opera audience. As was common television practice of the time, the series' videotapes were wiped for reuse. As a result, none of its 147 episodes are believed to have survived.

Created by Anthony Cornish, other writers on the programme included Gerry Davis, Brian Hayles, Malcolm Hulke and John Lucarotti. The directors included Innes Lloyd and Derek Martinus. Aside from Cornish, all of these individuals also worked on Doctor Who concurrent with their involvement in United!. Another Doctor Who connection was Derrick Sherwin, who featured briefly as a fiery Welsh striker and went on to write and produce extensively for the sci-fi series.

Cast
David Lodge, as Gerry Barford (manager)
Ursula O'Leary, as Mary Barford (his wife)
Ben Howard as Curly Parker (136 episodes, 1965–1967)
Mark Kingston as Danny South (133 episodes, 1965–1967)
Robin Wentworth as Ted Dawson (116 episodes, 1965–1967)
Beverley Jones as Deirdre Gosling (105 episodes, 1965–1967)
Graham Weston as Gregg Harris (89 episodes, 1965–1967)
John Breslin as Bob McIver (88 episodes, 1966–1967)
George Layton as Jimmy Stokes (85 episodes, 1965–1966)
Marigold Sharman as Fiona Nixon (78 episodes, 1966–1967)
Jill Meers as Amanda Holly (74 episodes, 1966–1967)
Harold Goodwin as Horace Martin (73 episodes, 1965–1966)
John Lyons as Alan Murdoch (70 episodes, 1966–1967)
Warwick Sims as Vic Clay (69 episodes, 1966–1967)
Michael Redfern as Chris Wood (59 episodes, 1965–1966)
Tony Caunter as Dick Mitchell (57 episodes, 1966–1967)
Stephen Yardley as Kenny Craig (55 episodes, 1965–1966)
Arthur Pentelow as Dan Davis (53 episodes, 1965–1966)
Ronald Allen as Mark Wilson (53 episodes, 1966–1967)
Ballard Berkeley as Dr. Newkes (53 episodes, 1966)

References

External links

Action TV
Nostalgia Central article

BBC television dramas
Lost BBC episodes
Lost television shows
1960s British television soap operas
1965 British television series debuts
1967 British television series endings
Fictional association football television series
British sports television series
British television soap operas
English-language television shows
Black-and-white British television shows